Severin County was a county (Romanian: județ) in the Kingdom of Romania, in the historical region of the Banat. Its capital was Lugoj. Severin County was established in 1926, disbanded with the administrative reform of 1938, re-created in 1940, and finally disbanded with the administrative reform of 1950.

Geography
Severin County covered 6,422 km2 and was located in the south-western part of Greater Romania, in the eastern part of the Banat. Currently, the territory that comprised Severin County is divided between Timiș, Caraș-Severin, Arad and Mehedinți counties. In the interwar period, the county neighbored Caraș and Timiș-Torontal counties to the west, Arad County to the north, Hunedoara County to the east, Mehedinți County to the southeast, and Kingdom of Yugoslavia to the south.

Administrative organization
Administratively, Severin County was originally divided into six districts (plăși): 
Plasa Birchiș, headquartered at Birchiș 
Plasa Caransebeș, headquartered at Caransebeș 
Plasa Făget, headquartered at Făget
Plasa Lugoj, headquartered at Lugoj
Plasa Orșova, headquartered at Orșova
Plasa Teregova, headquartered at Teregova

Subsequently, two more districts were established.Plasa Balinț, headquartered at Balinț
Plasa Sacul, headquartered at Sacu

The county had three urban communes (cities): Lugoj (the county's headquarters), Caransebes and Orşova.

Population 
According to the census data of 1930, the county's population was 239,586, which were ethnically divided as follows: 76.6% Romanians, 9.6% Germans, 6.6% Hungarians, 2.2% Romanies, as well as other minorities. From the religious point of view, the majority of the county population consisted of Eastern Orthodox (75.4%), followed by Roman Catholics (14.9%), Greek Catholics (3.9%), Reformed (3.1%) as well as other minorities.

Urban environment 
In 1930, the county's urban population was 40,456 inhabitants, ethnically 47.3% Romanians, 24.5% Germans, 16.8% Hungarians, 4.6% Jews, 3.1% Romanies, 1.2% Czechs and Slovaks, as well as other minorities. From the religious point of view, the urban population consisted of 46.4% Eastern Orthodox, 36.4% Roman Catholic, 4.9% Reformed, 4.8% Jewish, 4.1% Greek Catholic, 2.3% Lutheran, as well as other minorities.

References

External links

  Severin County on memoria.ro

Former counties of Romania
1926 establishments in Romania
1938 disestablishments in Romania
1940 establishments in Romania
1950 disestablishments in Romania
States and territories established in 1926
States and territories disestablished in 1938
States and territories established in 1940
States and territories disestablished in 1950